Empire of Bones is a 2013 fantasy novel written by N.D. Wilson. It is the third installment in the Ashtown Burials series, and a sequel to The Drowned Vault. The plot follows Cyrus and Antigone Smith through their greatest trial yet. With the help of decreasingly few allies, the Smiths must find a way to beat the young Dr. Oliver Phoenix, defeat Radu Bey along with the rest of the transmortals, and restore the Order of Brendan. To win, Cyrus must embrace his courage and leadership.

References

External links 

2013 American novels
American young adult novels
Young adult fantasy novels
Novels by N. D. Wilson
2013 fantasy novels
Random House books